Thomas House and variations may refer to:

Canada 
 Thomas House (Oakville, Ontario)

United States (by state)
Thomas Homestead, Fairview, Arkansas, listed on the National Register of Historic Places (NRHP)
Thomas House (Fourmile Hill, Arkansas), NRHP-listed
Greene Thomas House, Leslie, Arkansas, NRHP-listed
Thomas House (Escondido, California), NRHP-listed
H. H. Thomas House,  Denver, Colorado, listed on the NRHP in Colorado
Thomas House (Louisville, Colorado), listed on the NRHP in Colorado
David W. Thomas House, Odessa, Delaware, NRHP-listed
Thomas Hall (Gainesville, Florida), NRHP-listed 
Thomas House (Sarasota, Florida), NRHP-listed
Owens–Thomas House, Savannah, Georgia, NRHP-listed 
F. D. Thomas House, Camp Point, Illinois, NRHP-listed
Lewis H. Thomas House, Virden, Illinois, NRHP-listed
Frank Thomas House, Oak Park, Illinois, NRHP-listed
Andrew Thomas House, Camden, Indiana,  NRHP-listed
Amon Clarence House, New Harmony, Indiana, listed on the NRHP in Indiana 
Robert Thomas House, Central City, Kentucky, NRHP-listed
Samuel B. Thomas House, Elizabethtown, Kentucky, listed on the NRHP in Kentucky
R. H. Thomas House, Hodegenville, Kentucky, listed on the NRHP in Kentucky
Kings Thomas III House, Lancaster, Kentucky, listed on the NRHP in Kentucky 
Jack Thomas House, Leitchfield, Kentucky, listed on the NRHP in Kentucky
John Thomas House, Mooresville, Kentucky, listed on the NRHP in Kentucky
Thomas House (Mulberry, Kentucky), listed on the NRHP in Kentucky
William J. Thomas House, Mulberry, Kentucky, listed on the NRHP in Kentucky
Solomon Thomas House, Salvisa, Kentucky, listed on the NRHP in Kentucky
Thomas House (Martin, Louisiana), NRHP-listed
Thomas House (Ruthsburg, Maryland), NRHP-listed
H. P. Thomas House, Taunton, Massachusetts, NRHP-listed
Dr. Nathan M. Thomas House, Schoolcraft, Michigan, listed on the NRHP in Michigan
Albert and Wilhelmina Thomas House, Jefferson City, Missouri, NRHP-listed
Frabrishous and Sarah A. Thomas House, Salisbury, Missouri, NRHP-listed
Dr. A.O. Thomas House, Kearney, Nebraska, listed on the NRHP in Nebraska
Dr. Roscius P. and Mary Mitchell Thomas House and Outbuildings, Bethlehem, North Carolina, NRHP-listed
James A. Thomas Farm, Pittsboro, North Carolina, NRHP-listed
William Thomas House, Bellefonte, Pennsylvania, NRHP-listed
Charles Thomas House, West Whiteland, Pennsylvania, NRHP-listed
Charles A. Thomas House, Sioux Falls, South Dakota, listed on the NRHP in South Dakota
John W. Thomas House, Collierville, Tennessee, listed on the NRHP in Tennessee
Thomas House Hotel, Red Boiling Springs, Tennessee, NRHP-listed
Oscar P. Thomas House, Abilene, Texas, listed on the NRHP in Texas
Milton and Minerva Thomas House, Park City, Utah, listed on the NRHP in Utah 
Gibbs-Thomas House, Salt Lake City, Utah, listed on the NRHP in Utah
Abijah Thomas House, Marion, Virginia, NRHP-listed in Virginia
Dr. Charles and Elsie Thomas House, Spokane, Washington, listed on the NRHP in Washington
Alma Thomas House, Washington, D.C., NRHP-listed

People
Thomas William House Sr. (1814–1880), merchant and cotton factor in Houston, Texas